Black is a small lunar impact crater that lies just to the southeast of the walled basin Kästner. To the south-southwest is the crater Ansgarius, and to the east is the small Dale. It is located near the eastern limb of the Moon, just to the southwest of the Mare Smythii.

Black is circular with a well-defined edge, and inner walls that slope down to a small interior floor. It is not notably marked by erosion or impacts. The northwest wall is separated from the rim of Kästner by less than one crater diameter. This crater was formerly designated Kästner F before it was named by the IAU.

References

 
 
 
 
 
 
 
 
 
 
 
 

Impact craters on the Moon